Kayla Thornton (born October 20, 1992) is an American professional basketball player for the New York Liberty of the Women's National Basketball Association (WNBA). In college, Thornton played for the University of Texas at El Paso.

Thornton was traded to the New York Liberty on January 16, 2023, as part of a 3-Team trade.

Career statistics

WNBA

Regular season

|-
| style="text-align:left;"| 2015
| style="text-align:left;"| Washington
| 10 || 0 || 8.8 || .333 || .000 || .667 || 2.1 || 0.1 || 0.3 || 0.3 || 0.5 || 2.2
|-
| style="text-align:left;"| 2017
| style="text-align:left;"| Dallas
| 34 || 1 || 17.2 || .412 || .279 || .800 || 3.3 || 0.9 || 0.6 || 0.2 || 0.7 || 6.8
|-
| style="text-align:left;"| 2018
| style="text-align:left;"| Dallas
| 34 || 32 || 28.6 || .447 || .355 || .860 || 4.0 || 1.8 || 1.0 || 0.4 || 1.1 || 9.2
|-
| style="text-align:left;"| 2019
| style="text-align:left;"| Dallas
| 27 || 25 || 30.4 || .343 || .272 || .931 || 5.3 || 1.8 || 0.9 || 0.3 || 1.6 || 10.4
|-
| style="text-align:left;"| 2020
| style="text-align:left;"| Dallas
| 22 || 14 || 25.3 || .429 || .347 || .875 || 5.1 || 0.8 || 0.9 || 0.2 || 1.1 || 7.3
|-
| style="text-align:left;"| 2021
| style="text-align:left;"| Dallas
| 31 || 25 || 27.6 || .421 || .349 || .849 || 5.6 || 1.5 || 0.8 || 0.2 || 1.0 || 7.5
|-
| style="text-align:left;"| 2022
| style="text-align:left;"| Dallas
| 36 || 35 || 29.2 || .471 || .329 || .829 || 5.9 || 1.8 || 1.1 || 0.6 || 1.2 || 8.0
|-
| style="text-align:left;"| Career
| style="text-align:left;"| 7 years, 2 teams
| 194 || 132 || 25.4 || .414 || .322 || .847 || 4.7 || 1.4 || 0.9 || 0.3 || 1.1 || 7.9

Playoffs

|-
| style="text-align:left;"| 2017
| style="text-align:left;"| Dallas
| 1 || 0 || 6.0 || .000 || .000 || .000 || 1.0 || 1.0 || 0.0 || 0.0 || 0.0 || 0.0
|-
| style="text-align:left;"| 2018
| style="text-align:left;"| Dallas
| 1 || 1 || 30.0 || .571 || .000 || .000 || 3.0 || 0.0 || 0.0 || 0.0 || 0.0 || 8.0
|-
| style="text-align:left;"| 2021
| style="text-align:left;"| Dallas
| 1 || 1 || 16.0 || .000 || .000 || .000 || 2.0 || 0.0 || 0.0 || 0.0 || 0.0 || 0.0
|-
| style="text-align:left;"| 2022
| style="text-align:left;"| Dallas
| 3 || 3 || 26.3 || .526 || .500 || 1.000 || 4.7 || 1.3 || 0.3 || 0.7 || 1.0 || 8.3
|-
| style="text-align:left;"| Career
| style="text-align:left;"| 4 years, 1 team
| 6 || 5 || 21.8 || .424 || .308 || 1.000 || 3.3 || 0.8 || 0.2 || 0.3 || 0.5 || 5.5

College
Source

Notes

External links
 WNBA Player Profile
 UTEP Miners bio

1992 births
Living people
American expatriate basketball people in South Korea
American women's basketball players
Basketball players from El Paso, Texas
Dallas Wings players
Power forwards (basketball)
Small forwards
UTEP Miners women's basketball players
Washington Mystics players
Undrafted Women's National Basketball Association players